The 1957 Western Michigan Broncos football team represented Western Michigan University in the Mid-American Conference (MAC) during the 1957 NCAA University Division football season.  In their first season under head coach Merle Schlosser, the Broncos compiled a 4–4–1 record (1–4–1 against MAC opponents), finished in fifth place in the MAC, and were outscored by their opponents, 150 to 126.  The team played its home games at Waldo Stadium in Kalamazoo, Michigan.

Quarterback Bob Mason was the team captain. End Joe Grigg received the team's most outstanding player award.

Merle Schlosser was named head football coach on January 19, 1957. Schlosser was a 29-year old Illinois graduate who had been an assistant coach at Missouri under Don Faurot in 1955 and 1956.

Schedule

References

Western Michigan
Western Michigan Broncos football seasons
Western Michigan Broncos football